The 1986 United States Senate election in Pennsylvania was held on November 4, 1986. Incumbent Republican U.S. Senator Arlen Specter won re-election to a second term.

Republican primary

Candidates
 Arlen Specter, incumbent U.S. Senator since 1981
 Richard A. Stokes, high school social studies teacher

Results
Specter defeated Stokes by a 3-to-1 margin.

Democratic primary

Candidates
 Donald A. Bailey, Pennsylvania State Auditor
 Robert W. Edgar, U.S. Representative from Broomall
 George H.R. Elder, Lyndon LaRouche supporter
 Cyril E. Sagan, Slippery Rock State University professor

Results
Edgar narrowly defeated Bailey with Elder and Sagan each receiving less than six percent.

General election

Candidates
 Bob Edgar, U.S. Representative from Broomall (Democratic)
 Lance S. Haver (Consumer)
 Arlen Specter, incumbent U.S. Senator since 1981 (Republican)

Campaign
Despite the popularity of his Republican counterpart John Heinz, Arlen Specter was viewed somewhat tepidly by the Pennsylvania electorate entering the race, although both men shared similar moderate profiles. Additionally, economic woes had dragged down the popularity of Republican candidates in the industrial states. Democrats sensed the vulnerability of the incumbent, and two men with similar experience in the U.S. House, but contrasting political views, vied for the nomination. Don Bailey, the state's incumbent Auditor General, projected a strong blue-collar image and had moderate positions that were often relatively close to Specter's. Bob Edgar, a Methodist minister and sitting Congressman, had more liberal viewpoints, as he was connected with the Vietnam War-era peace movement and the anti-corruption movement following the Watergate scandals. However, issues played a very minor role in the primary, which instead showcased the state's geographical divide, with Delaware County-based Edgar narrowly defeating Westmoreland County-based Bailey.

True to his past as a political organizer, Edgar developed a strong grassroots campaign and reached out to alienated left-leaning voters. He attacked Specter as a politician who compromised his moderate political positions when pressured by the conservative administration of Ronald Reagan. Edgar, who had a history of winning tight races in a traditionally Rockefeller Republican congressional district, was a financial underdog, as Specter was able to raise nearly three times as much for his campaign warchest. Originally attempting a positive campaign, Specter changed his strategy in response to Edgar's personal attacks and characterized Edgar as soft on defense issues and as a liberal ideologue. Edgar was never able to find a message that resonated with voters in the western portion of the state, and Specter undercut Edgar's support in his suburban Philadelphia heartland by presenting himself as representative of the views of the average suburban voter.

Results

See also 
 1986 United States Senate elections

References 

Pennsylvania
1986
1986 Pennsylvania elections